Alexander Erler and Lucas Miedler were the defending champions but chose not to compete.

Marco Bortolotti and Arjun Kadhe won the title after defeating Michael Geerts and Alexander Ritschard 7–6(7–5), 6–2 in the final.

Seeds

Draw

References

External links
 Main draw

Città di Forlì - Doubles